The Telford Medal is a prize awarded by the British Institution of Civil Engineers (ICE) for a paper or series of papers. It was introduced in 1835 following a bequest made by Thomas Telford, the ICE's first president. It can be awarded in gold, silver or bronze; the Telford Gold Medal is the highest award the institution can bestow.

History
In 1834 Scottish civil engineer and the Institution of Civil Engineers' first president (1820-1834), Thomas Telford died, leaving in his will his library of technical works to the Institution of Civil Engineers, as well as a bequest of £2000; the interest from which was to be used to for the purpose of "Annual Premiums". The council of the institute decided to expend the premiums on both honorary and monetary rewards, the honorary awards being named Telford Medals, which would be awarded in gold, silver and bronze forms. Suitable candidates for the awards were submitters of drawings, models, diagrams or essays relating to civil engineering or any other new equipment of invention relating to engineering or surveying in general, which is regarded as most seminal and influential. The awards were to be open to both Englishmen and foreigners equally. After provision for the Telford Medal, the remaining income is used for up to four annual prizes for papers presented to the institution.

The inaugural gold award was given in June 1837 to John Timperley for his account of the history and construction of the town docks of the Port of Kingston upon Hull, published in volume 1 of the Transactions of the Institution of Civil Engineers; the medals carried an image of Telford on one side, and of his Menai Bridge on the reverse. The bust of Telford was a design by William Wyon and the medal is also signed "J. S. and A. B. Wyon" a collaboration of Joseph Shepherd Wyon and his brother, Alfred Benjamin Wyon. John Macneill, James M. Rendel, Michael A. Borthwick, Peter Barlow, and Benedetto Albano received silver awards in the same session.

Recipients

Telford Medal

The Telford gold medal is issued generally once a year. See below for the Telford Premium of which a larger number (up to 10, may be issued each year in the silver and bronze categories).

21st century

20th century

19th century

Undated (before 1910) recipients of Telford Medal
Source: Institute of Civil Engineers

 Frederick William Bidder
 Reginald Pelham Bolton
 Wifred Swanwick Boult
 John Richard Brittle
 Harley Hugh Dalrymple-Hay, for paper on the Waterloo & City tube
 George Deuchars
 William Tregarthen Douglass
 Frederick Eliot Duckham
 Maurice Fitzmaurice, for paper on the Blackwall Tunnel, 1897
 Sir Douglas Fox
 Sir Charles Augustus Hartley
 David Hay, for paper on the Blackwall Tunnel, 1897
 Bertram Hopkinson
 Bernard Maxwell Jenkin
 Harry Edward Jones
 Sidney Richard Lowcock
 John Bower Mackenzie
 James Tayler Milton
 Richard Clerk Parsons
 John James Webster
 William Willcocks
 William Henry Wheeler (1832-1915)
 John Head (1832-1881) 
 Thomas T. Barton 
 David William Brunton

Telford Premium
Telford Premiums are issued initially as a monetary or book award with multiple awards in most years, some of the awards also going to Medal winners.
 1897 Colonel John Pennycuick "The Diversion of the Periyar."
 1897 Edward Clapp Shankland "Steel Skeleton Construction in Chicago."
 1897 Thomas Holgate "The Enrichment of Coal-Gas."
 1897 Dugald Drummond "Investigation into the Use of Progressive High Pressures in Non-compound Locomotive Engines."
Alexander Pelham Trotter "The Distribution and Measurement of Illumination"  
1913 - 1914 William Willox M.A.
1921 Percy Allen - Port improvements at Newcastle, New South Wales
 1926 Joseph Newell Reeson “The Influence of Electric Welding in the Design and Fabrication of Plant and Structures.”
 1955 Terence Patrick O'Sullivan "The Strengthening of Steel Structures Under Load"

See also
 List of engineering awards

References

External links

Awards of the Institution of Civil Engineers
Civil engineering awards
Awards established in 1835
British science and technology awards